Meadhbh Stokes is a former camogie player, captain of the All Ireland Camogie Championship winning team in 1999, the first at senior level for Tipperary.

Career
She played with Tipperary when they won their breakthrough Intermediate All Ireland title in 1997 and when they eventually won an All Ireland medals in 1999,

References

External links
 Camogie.ie Official Camogie Association Website
 Wikipedia List of Camogie players

Tipperary camogie players
Living people
Year of birth missing (living people)